Helcomyza mirabilis is a species of fly in the family Helcomyzidae.

References

Helcomyzidae
Articles created by Qbugbot
Insects described in 1920